Cape Runaway is the eastern extremity of the Bay of Plenty in New Zealand's North Island. It is located 157 kilometres northeast off Whakatāne and 65 kilometres west of East Cape.

The name Cape Runaway was bestowed by English mariner James Cook during his first voyage of discovery in 1769. It was so named after Māori in canoes who had approached Cooks' ship Endeavour in a hostile manner scurried off after a cannon shot was fired.

Demographics
The SA1 area is part of the Cape Runaway statistical area.

The SA1 area had a population of 111 at the 2018 New Zealand census, a decrease of 6 people (−5.1%) since the 2013 census, and an increase of 6 people (5.7%) since the 2006 census. There were 45 households, comprising 54 males and 54 females, giving a sex ratio of 1.0 males per female. The median age was 40.6 years (compared with 37.4 years nationally), with 30 people (27.0%) aged under 15 years, 15 (13.5%) aged 15 to 29, 45 (40.5%) aged 30 to 64, and 18 (16.2%) aged 65 or older.

Ethnicities were 18.9% European/Pākehā, 86.5% Māori, and 13.5% Pacific peoples. People may identify with more than one ethnicity.

Although some people chose not to answer the census's question about religious affiliation, 24.3% had no religion, 48.6% were Christian, 16.2% had Māori religious beliefs and 2.7% had other religions.

Of those at least 15 years old, 12 (14.8%) people had a bachelor's or higher degree, and 12 (14.8%) people had no formal qualifications. The median income was $20,000, compared with $31,800 nationally. 9 people (11.1%) earned over $70,000 compared to 17.2% nationally. The employment status of those at least 15 was that 39 (48.1%) people were employed full-time, 12 (14.8%) were part-time, and 6 (7.4%) were unemployed.

Cape Runaway statistical area

Cape Runaway had a population of 1,449 at the 2018 New Zealand census, a decrease of 84 people (−5.5%) since the 2013 census, and a decrease of 231 people (−13.8%) since the 2006 census. There were 579 households, comprising 711 males and 738 females, giving a sex ratio of 0.96 males per female. The median age was 46.0 years (compared with 37.4 years nationally), with 297 people (20.5%) aged under 15 years, 201 (13.9%) aged 15 to 29, 657 (45.3%) aged 30 to 64, and 294 (20.3%) aged 65 or older.

Ethnicities were 27.1% European/Pākehā, 85.7% Māori, 3.7% Pacific peoples, and 0.4% Asian. People may identify with more than one ethnicity.

The percentage of people born overseas was 5.4, compared with 27.1% nationally.

Although some people chose not to answer the census's question about religious affiliation, 29.0% had no religion, 41.0% were Christian, 23.6% had Māori religious beliefs, 0.2% were Hindu, 0.2% were Muslim, 0.4% were Buddhist and 0.8% had other religions.

Of those at least 15 years old, 129 (11.2%) people had a bachelor's or higher degree, and 294 (25.5%) people had no formal qualifications. The median income was $20,400, compared with $31,800 nationally. 66 people (5.7%) earned over $70,000 compared to 17.2% nationally. The employment status of those at least 15 was that 477 (41.4%) people were employed full-time, 177 (15.4%) were part-time, and 78 (6.8%) were unemployed.

Marae

Whangaparāōa Marae, located near Cape Runaway, is a traditional meeting place for Te Whānau-ā-Apanui's hapū of Te Whānau a Kauaetangohia.

It includes Kauaetangohia or Te Putahou meeting house.

Education

References

Ōpōtiki District
Landforms of the Bay of Plenty Region
Runaway
Populated places in the Bay of Plenty Region